RLE may refer to:

Science and technology
 Run-length encoding, a form of lossless data compression

 Radical life extension, a study to extend human lifespan
 Refractive lens exchange, procedure for placing a multifocal intraocular lens
 Research Laboratory of Electronics at MIT
 Right-to-left embedding, in bi-directional text

Other uses
 Real-life experience (transgender), a period of time in which transgender individuals live full-time in their preferred gender role